Homeobox protein Hox-B8 is a protein that in humans is encoded by the HOXB8 gene.

Function 

This gene is a member of the Antp homeobox family and encodes a nuclear protein with a homeobox DNA-binding domain. It is included in a cluster of Homeobox B genes located on chromosome 17. The encoded protein functions as a sequence-specific transcription factor that is involved in development. Increased expression of this gene is associated with colorectal cancer. Mice that have had the murine ortholog (see ) of this gene knocked out exhibit an excessive pathologic grooming behavior. This behavior is similar to the hair-pulling behavior of humans suffering from trichotillomania (TTM).

Transplantation of normal (wild-type) bone marrow into a Hoxb8 mutant mouse results in a reduction of compulsive grooming.

See also 
 Homeobox

References

Further reading

External links 
 

Transcription factors